Kenji Takama J.S.C. (born March 10, 1949 in Suginami, Tokyo, Japan) is a Japanese cinematographer. Takama is a member of the Japanese Society of Cinematographers.

Biography 

As a student at Tokyo Metropolitan University, Kenji Takama first studied Economics. Later, he began working as a camera assistant at Wakamatsu Productions and began shooting commercials, leading to his first assignment as a director of photography on the film Gassan (1978). He received a scholarship to the Artists' Training Program of the Culture Agency, and moved to Hollywood, and then to New York.  While in the United States, he trained under a number of cinematographers:  Harry Wolf for Little House On The Prairie, John Alonzo for Blue Thunder, John Alcott for The Beast Master, Vilmos Zsigmond for Table For Five, Owen Roizman for Tootsie, and Gordon Willis for Broadway Danny Rose (IMDb, 2019).

After returning to Japan, he worked primarily with younger directors such as Naoto Yamakawa, Shusuke Kaneko, Shun Nakahara and Fran Kuzui. He received the best photography award twice at the Yokohama Film Festival: for Summer Vacation 1999 (1988) and Misty Kid Of Wind (1988).  At the Osaka Film Festival, he won best cinematography honors for A High School Teacher and Hear The Duck's Song (1993). He also received the Best photography by children Julie at Poland Film Festival for Naran (1995) and was nominated for best photography at the Japanese Academy Award for Welcome Back, Mr. Macdonald (1997). Further, a Japanese Academy Award nom (1998) for 'Rajio no jikan'''.

 Filmography 
"Watashi wa zettai yurusanai"(2018)-Director of Photography 
"The salt of the earth, Gunpei Yamamuro"(2017)-Director of Photography 
"Madou: After the Rain"(2017)-Cinematographer
"Kagami no naka no egao tachi" (2016)-Cinematographer
"Manga niku to boku" (2014)-Cinematographer
"Yokohama Story" (2013)-Cinematographer
"Watashi no michi: Waga inochi no tango" (2012)-Cinematographer
"Share House" (2011)-Cinematographer
"Jazz Jii Men "(2011)-Cinematographer
"Manatsu no yo no yume" （2009）-Cinematographer
"Cafe Daikanyama III" （2009）-Cinematographer
"Puraido" (2008)-CinematographerSunshine Days "(2008)
The Hole (2008)- cinematographer
Cindellera of the Entrance Exam (2008)-Cinematographer
Kotatsu neko (2007)- Cinematographer
Death Note: The Last Name (2007) - Cinematographer
Ulysses - Cinematographer 2006
God's Left Hand, Devil's Right Hand - Cinematographer 2006
Haha: Toyoko, aru kazoku no ai to kanashimi - Cinematographer 2006
9/10 - Cinematographer 2005
'Chô' kowai hanashi the movie: yami no eigasai - Cinematographer 2005
Taga kokoro nimo ryu wa nemuru - Cinematographer 2005
Life on the Longboard - Cinematographer 2005
Synesthesia - Cinematographer 2005
Fantastipo - Cinematographer 2005
Metasequoia no ki no shita de - Cinematographer 2005
Shômei kumagai gakkô (documentary) - Cinematographer 2004
Road 88: Deaiji shikoku e - Cinematographer 2004
Mousugu haru - Cinematographer 2004
Kanzen naru shiiku: onna rihatsushi no koi - Cinematographer 2003
Shirayuri Club Tokyo e iku (documentary) - Cinematographer 2003
Iden & Tity - Cinematographer 2003
Hotel Hibiscus - Cinematographer 2002
All About Our House - Cinematographer 2001
Murudeka 17805 - Cinematographer 2001
Crossfire - Cinematographer 2000
Nabbie no koi - Director of Photography 1999
Rajio no jikan - Cinematographer 1997
Dorîmu sutajiamu - Cinematographer 1997
Yukai - Camera Operator 1997
Tokimeki Memorial - Cinematographer 1997
Kimi wo wasurenai - Cinematographer 1995
Naran: White Horse - Cinematographer 1995
Shiroi Uma: White Horse - Cinematographer 1995
Shoot - Cinematographer 1994
High School Teacher - Cinematographer 1993
Ahiru no uta ga kikoete kuru yo. - Cinematographer 1993
Angel: boku no uta wa kimi no uta - Cinematographer 1992
Usureyuku kioku no nakade - Cinematographer 1992
Juninin no yasashii nihonjin - Cinematographer 	 1991
Kaze no kuni - Cinematographer 1991
Jutai - Cinematographer 1991
Hong Kong Paradise - Cinematographer 1990
Docchini suruno - Cinematographer 1989
Kaze no matasaburo - Garasu no manto - Cinematographer 1989
Last Cabaret - Cinematographer 1988
Tokyo Pop - Camera Operator 1988
Summer Vacation 1999 - Cinematographer 1988
Yamadamura waltz - Cinematographer 1988
New Morning of Billy the Kid - Cinematographer 	 1986
Broadway Danny Rose - Camera Intern (uncredited) 1984
Table for Five - Camera Intern (uncredited) 1983
Blue Thunder - Camera Operator 	1983
Tootsie - Camera Intern (uncredited) 1982
The Beastmaster - Assistant Camera, Camera Intern 1982	*Gassan - Cinematographer 1978
Devil's Song Assistant Camera 1975
Tidal Wave - Assistant Camera 1973
Sei kazoku - Assistant Camera 1971

References

External links

Kenji Takama's Official Site
 

Japanese cinematographers
People from Suginami
Living people
1949 births